Mihailo Stošović (Belgrade, 1971) is a Serbian sculptor, also known as Vajar Beogradski.

Life 
Stošović was born, on 23 April 1971 in Belgrade, into a well-known family with enviable tradition in stone processing. He is professionally engaged in sculpting since 2007. He graduated from the Faculty of Applied Arts in Belgrade, Department of Conservation and Restoration of the sculpture in the class of prof. Slobodan Savić. Section Committee President of ULUPUDS since 2014. Professor of sculpture at the Center for Art Education "Šumatovačka".

He had many solo exhibitions and participated in dozens of group of international and domestic exhibitions and symposiums. Mihailo's artworks are found in public spaces and private collections in Serbia, Russia, Israel, Switzerland, Slovenia, and Montenegro.

He is a member of ULUS (Association Des Arts Plastiques De Serbie); ULUPUDS (Applied Artists and Designers Association of Serbia); and UVS (Sculptor Association of Serbia) with the status of an independent artist. Stošović lives and works in Belgrade.

Since 2011, he actively participates in projects such as "12+", "Annual exhibition of Serbian sculptors" and others, together with sculptors from various Belgrade associations. His association colleagues include Professor Zdravko Milinkovic, Vuk Ljubisavljević, Ivan Gračner, Mihailo Gerun and others.

Professional work

Public works 
 Dragana Marčić memorial in Belgrade "Wave of Eternity", Belgrade 2007
 Restoration and Conservation of facade statue "The Girl with the violin" on the haus of Milutin Milanković, Belgrade 2008
 Painter Dragan Kecman memorial in Kučevo – "Spirit of Homolje", 2009
 Polijelej in the Church of St. George in Banovo Brdo, Belgrade 2009
 "Sleeping Knight" – Bela Voda near Kruševac, 2009 
 Restoration and Conservation of Roman sarcophagus from the 3rd century – Sirmium, Belgrade 2010
 Restoration and Conservation of Roman sarcophagus from the 3rd century – Singidunum, Belgrade 2010
 "Teddy" – Belgrade, 2012
  Miloš Radovanović memorial  "Pogled", Belgrade 2013
 Restoration and Conservation of cemetery "Russian Necropolis", Belgrade, 2014

Significant exhibitions and awards

Gallery

References

External links 

 ALO/Intervju
 depARTment profil
 Izložba "Seme stvaranja", Galerija "PROGRES"
 SACHIART profil
 Bulevar u 5 do 5 TV Prva
 Srpska televizija Čikago
 Vajarska radionica u "Šumatovačkoj" Moja TV
 Reportaža Moja TV
 Emisija "Ram" TV Studio B 1.
 Emisija "Ram" TV Studio B 2.
 Jutarnji program RTV Stara Pazova
 Samostalna izložba „Seme STVARANJA“, Galerija Kulturnog centra u Paraćinu
 Samostalna izložba „Seme“, Dom Kulture Čačak

Serbian sculptors
Male sculptors
Abstract sculptors
Contemporary sculptors
1971 births
Living people